Chaudhry Aftab Ahmed Gujjar (April 16, 1957 – May 9, 2009) was a senior advocate of the Supreme Court Of Pakistan.

Sources
https://web.archive.org/web/20150219172646/http://paswal.com/famous_gujjars.html
https://web.archive.org/web/20150213230151/http://gujjarnews.com/?cat=787

2009 deaths
1957 births
20th-century Pakistani lawyers